Caleb Scudder (1795 in New Jersey – 1866 in Indianapolis, Indiana) was the third mayor of the city of Indianapolis, Indiana, and served from 1851 to 1854 as a member of the Whig Party. Born in New Jersey, Scudder moved at a young age to Dayton, Ohio. He was a cabinet-maker by trade, but also served as a magistrate before his term as mayor.

References

1795 births
1866 deaths
Mayors of Indianapolis
Indiana Whigs
19th-century American politicians